HMS Alcide,  the French and Italian version of "Alcides", another name for Heracles, was a 74-gun third-rate ship of the line of the Royal Navy, designed by Sir Thomas Slade and built by Adam Hayes at Deptford Dockyard being launched on 30 July 1779.

Service History
On launch she was under command of Captain John Brisbane. She had a huge crew of 550 men. Under Brisbane she was part of the major British attack on the Caracas convoy in January 1780.

She fought at the battles of Cape St Vincent and Martinique in 1780, and the battles of St. Kitts and the Saintes in 1782.

On 12 September 1780 Alcide captured the letter of marque Pocahontas.

In January 1782 she took part in the Battle of St Kitts (aka the Battle of Frigate Bay).

On 12 April 1782 Alcide was third in line of attack against the French fleet at the Battle of the Saintes, under the command of Captain Charles Thomson.

Alcide took part in operations against Corsica in September 1793, where she served as flagship to Commodore Robert Linzee.

Notable Commanders

Captain John Brisbane 1779/80
Captain Benjamin Caldwell 1787/8
Sir Andrew Snape Douglas 1790 to 1792
Captain Robert Linzee 1792/3 (raised to Rear Admiral)
Captain John Woodley 1793/4
Captain Thomas Revell Shivers briefly in 1794
Sir Thomas Byard briefly in 1794
Vice Admiral Phillips Cosby 1794

Notable Crew

Lord Robert Manners - 2nd lieutenant 1779/80
Thomas Revell Shivers - flag captain (commodore) 1794

Fate

She was paid off in Portsmouth in 1794 and a survey had found her uneconomic to repair. 

She was used as a receiving ship in Portsmouth Dock from 1802 until 1817, having had all guns removed.
 
Alcide was broken up at Portsmouth in April 1817.

Citations and notes

References

 Lavery, Brian (2003) The Ship of the Line - Volume 1: The development of the battlefleet 1650-1850. Conway Maritime Press. .

Ships built in Deptford
Albion-class ships of the line (1763)
1779 ships